David Scott Phillips (born 31 March 1994) is a Welsh former first-class cricketer.

Phillips was born at Swansea in March 1994. He was educated at Coedcae School, before going up to Cardiff Metropolitan University. While studying at Cardiff, he made a single appearance in first-class cricket for Cardiff MCCU against Glamorgan at Sophia Gardens in 2013. taking the wickets of Will Bragg and Stewart Walters in the Glamorgan first innings, in addition to scoring 7 runs from the tail in the Cardiff first innings. In addition to playing first-class cricket, Phillips also played minor counties cricket for Wales Minor Counties in 2012, making four appearances in the Minor Counties Championship.

References

External links

1994 births
Living people
Cricketers from Swansea
Alumni of Cardiff Metropolitan University
Welsh cricketers
Wales National County cricketers
Cardiff MCCU cricketers